Nitrosonium octafluoroxenate(VI) is a chemical compound of xenon with nitrogen, oxygen, and fluorine, having formula . It is an ionic compound containing well-separated nitrosonium cations (NO+) and octafluoroxenate(VI) anions. The molecular geometry of the octafluoroxenate(VI) ion is square antiprismatic, having Xe–F bond lengths of 1.971 Å, 1.946 Å, 1.958 Å, 2.052 Å, and 2.099 Å.

It is synthesized by the reaction of xenon hexafluoride with nitrosyl fluoride (NOF):

 + 2 NOF → 

Other compounds containing the octafluoroxenate(VI) ion include its alkali metal salts, including Cs2XeF8 and Rb2XeF8, which are stable up to 400 °C.

References

Xenon(VI) compounds
Fluoro complexes